Chris Mahony (born 19 June 1981 in Auckland, New Zealand) is a former rugby union player for the Auckland Air New Zealand Cup team, playing fullback centre or wing. He played for Oxford University where he has completed a Masters in African Studies and a DPhil in Politics.

Education 
Manony holds Bachelor of Commerce (B.Com.) and of Laws (LL.B.) degrees from the University of Otago, and a Master’s in African Studies (M.Sc.) and a D.Phil. in Politics from the University of Oxford.

He was admitted to the bar of the High Court of New Zealand in 2006 where he appeared for the Crown in criminal and refugee matters.

Career 
In 2003, Mahony drafted recommendations on governance and corruption for the Sierra Leone Truth and Reconciliation Commission. In 2008, he directed the Witness Evaluation Legacy Project at the Special Court for Sierra Leone. Between 2012-2013, he served as Deputy Director of the New Zealand Centre for Human Rights Law, Policy and Practice at Auckland University, Faculty of Law.

2015 to 2018, Mahony was consultant adviser to the UNDP on approaches to conflict prevention and transitional justice. In 2017, he instructed at Peking University Law School.

Mahony serves as deputy director of Auckland University Law School's New Zealand Centre for Human Rights Law, Policy and Practice. He teaches international human rights and international criminal law while completing his doctorate at the University of Oxford. Now Dr. Christopher B. Mahony is a Research Fellow at the Centre for International Law Research and Policy and Visiting Research Fellow at Georgetown University Law Center. He functions as Political Economy Adviser at the Independent Evaluation Group at the World Bank, where he formerly served as Criminal Justice and Citizen Security Specialist 2014-2015.

Publications 
 "The Justice Sector Afterthought: Witness Protection in Africa", Institute for Security Studies, Pretoria, 2010. 
 "A Case Selection Independence Framework for Tracing Historical Interests’ Manifestation in International Criminal Justice", in Morten Bergsmo, CHEAH Wui Ling, SONG Tianying and YI Ping (editors): "Historical Origins of International Criminal Law: Volume 4", Torkel Opsahl Academic EPublisher, Brussels, 2015, pp. 865–903.
 "If you’re not at the table, you’re on the menu: Complementarity and Self-Interest in Domestic Processes for Core International Crimes", in Morten Bergsmo and SONG Tianying (editors): "Military Self-Interest in Accountability for Core International Crimes", Torkel Opsahl Academic EPublisher, Brussels, 2015, pp. 229–260.
 "Transitional Justice in Sierra Leone: Theory, History and Evaluation", in Kirsten Ainley, Rebekka Freidman and Chris Mahony (editors): "Evaluating Transitional Justice: Accountability and Peacebuilding in Post-Conflict Sierra Leone", Palgrave Macmillan, New York, 2015 (with Kirsten Ainley and Rebekka Friedman).  
 "A Political Tool? The Politics of Case Selection at the Special Court for Sierra Leone", in Kirsten Ainley, Rebekka Freidman and Chris Mahony (editors): "Evaluating Transitional Justice: Accountability and Peacebuilding in Post-Conflict Sierra Leone", Palgrave Macmillan, New York, 2015.
 "The Truth about the Truth: Insider Reflections on the TRC", in Kirsten Ainley, Rebekka Freidman and Chris Mahony (editors): "Evaluating Transitional Justice: Accountability and Peacebuilding in Post-Conflict Sierra Leone", Palgrave Macmillan, New York, 2015 (co-author with Yasmin Sooka).
 "The Potential and Politics of Transitional Justice: Interactions between the Global and the Local in Evaluations of Success", in Kirsten Ainley, Rebekka Freidman and Chris Mahony (editors): "Evaluating Transitional Justice: Accountability and Peacebuilding in Post-Conflict Sierra Leone", Palgrave Macmillan, New York, 2015 (co-author with Ainley and Friedman).
 "The Justice Pivot: US International Criminal Law Influence from Outside the ICC", Georgetown Journal of International Law, 2015, 46(4).
 "Sierra Leone: The Justice v. Reconciliation Archetype?", Torkel Opsahl Academic EPublisher, FICHL Policy Brief Series No. 33, Brussels, 2015.
 "Aspirational yet precarious: New Zealand refugee settlement policy’s compliance with international human rights obligations", in Mary Crock, Farida Fozdar and Chris Mahony (editors), "A ‘slippery fish’: The differential application of human rights obligations to the settlement of refugees in the ‘Group of Five’ States", (special edition of) International Journal of Migration and Border Studies, 2016 (4) (with Jay Marlowe, Natalie Baird, Louise Humpage).
 "International Criminal Justice Case Selection Independence: An ICJ Barometer", FICHL Policy Brief Series No. 58 (2016), Torkel Opsahl Academic EPublisher, Brussels, 2016.
 "Where Politics Borders Law: The Malawi-Tanzania Boundary Dispute", New Zealand Centre for Human Rights, Africa Working Paper Series, Working Paper 21 February 2014 (with Hannah Clark, Meghan Bolwell, Tom Simcock, Richard Potter, JIA Meng).
 "Review of ‘Rescuing a Fragile State: Sierra Leone 2002–2008’", edited by L. Gberie Waterloo, Wilfrid Laurier University Press, Ontario, 2009. See also Journal of Modern African Studies, 50 (3) 2012.
 "Addressing Corruption in Post Conflict Sierra Leone", Governance Review, CGG, June 2006.

References

External links
Auckland Rugby - Chris Mahony
Rugby: Seven new faces in Auckland squad

1981 births
Living people
Auckland rugby union players
New Zealand rugby union players
Rugby union fullbacks
World Bank people
Rugby union players from Auckland
University of Otago alumni
Alumni of University College, Oxford